Absconditella amabilis is a species of lichen in the family Stictidaceae, first found in inland rainforests of British Columbia.

References

Further reading
Björk, Curtis R., Trevor Goward, and Toby Spribille. "New Records and Range Extensions of Rare Lichens from Waterfalls and Sprayzones in Inland British Columbia, Canada." Evansia 26.4 (2009): 219–224.

Ostropales
Lichen species
Lichens described in 2009
Lichens of Western Canada
Taxa named by Toby Spribille
Fungi without expected TNC conservation status